FC Rus was a Russian football club from Saint Petersburg, founded in 2010. In 2011/12 season the team played in the Russian amateur championship, zone North-West and won the zonal tournament.

In 2012/13 season the team began to play in the Russian Second Division, after becoming a professional football club. Midway through the 2013/14 season, the team dropped out of the league due to lack of financing, releasing all players.

External links 
 Official site (in Russian)

Defunct football clubs in Saint Petersburg
Association football clubs established in 2010
2010 establishments in Russia
Association football clubs disestablished in 2014
2014 disestablishments in Russia